Žygimantas Janavičius (born February 20, 1989) is a Lithuanian professional basketball player for Neptūnas Klaipėda of the Lithuanian Basketball League.

Career
Janavičius made his pro debut with BC Alytus in 2005. He played two seasons with the club in the NKL.

In 2007, Janavičius signed with Žalgiris of Kaunas. He played one season for youth team, which were competing in NKL, and became the champion of the league. He played for BC Žalgiris in 2008–09, and half of the season in 2009–10, but because he was only given a small role on the team, he asked for to be loaned to Kauno Aisčiai, where he finished the season. In 2010–11, he played for BC Šiauliai. He started the 2011–2012 season with Kauno Baltai, but at the end of the season, he joined BC Žalgiris. After winning the championship of the LKL, he became a free agent.

In August 2012, he signed with Prienų Rūdupis.

National team career
Janavičius won two silver medals while representing the Lithuanian youth squad in the 2006 FIBA Europe Under-18 Championship and the 2008 FIBA Europe Under-20 Championship. In 2014, coach Jonas Kazlauskas included Janavičius in the preliminary 24-player squad for the main Lithuania national basketball team, though he failed to compete for the spot in the national team's roster due to a broken palm. Janavičius was included in the candidates list once again in 2015. He did not make the EuroBasket 2015 roster either during his second try, when Lukas Lekavičius was taken instead of him less than a week before the championship began.

Statistics

References

1989 births
Living people
Basketball Löwen Braunschweig players
BC Lietkabelis players
BC Neptūnas players
BC Prienai players
BC Rytas players
BC Šiauliai players
BC Žalgiris players
BC Žalgiris-2 players
Lithuanian expatriate basketball people in Germany
Lithuanian men's basketball players
LSU-Atletas basketball players
Point guards